Sphegina clunipes is a Palearctic species of hoverfly.

Description
External images
For terms see Morphology of Diptera
Males: The abdomen bulges only slightly at end. The width to tergite 4 about equal to
length of sternite 4 and in the form of a slightly broadened rectangle toward
back side, about twice as long as wide. Frons relatively broad. Surstyli narrow
and long; length about four times width. 
Females: width of sternite 4 about 1.5 times length. 
Body length 6.0 to 7.0mm. See references for determination.

Distribution
Palearctic Fennoscandia South to the Pyrenees and Spain. Ireland East through Central Europe and Southern Europe into European Russia and the Caucasus; through Siberia and the Russian Far East to Japan.

Habitat
Woodland.

Biology
Flies up to 2m from in dappled sunlight or shade at the edge of clearings, in woodland glades, along tracks and beside streams usually near water from May to September. Flowers visited include Cardamine pratensis, Crataegus, Euphorbia, Geranium pratense, Geranium robertianum, Potentilla erecta, Prunus spinosa, Ranunculus, Rubus fruticosus, Sanicula, Stachys, Veronica.

References

Diptera of Europe
Eristalinae
Taxa named by Carl Fredrik Fallén
Insects described in 1816